St. Kentigern's Academy is a Roman Catholic, comprehensive school in Blackburn, West Lothian, Scotland.

The school was built in 1973 and refurbished in 1995/6. An extensive refurbishment of the school was completed in September 2009.

Scottish singer-songwriter Lewis Capaldi was a former pupil at the school as was playwright Stephen Greenhorn.

Notable former pupils
 Susan Boyle
 Lewis Capaldi
 Fern Brady
Stephen Greenhorn

Press coverage
In 2009, there was a formal opening of a £19,000,000 refurbishment and extension to the school; guests included the late Cardinal Keith O'Brien, as well as singer Susan Boyle, who is a former pupil.

In 2012, a group of pupils made a video to highlight the high rate of poverty amongst children in the UK, and submitted it to competition for Unicef. As well as winning the competition, they were also awarded a Rotary Young Citizens Award.

In 2017 a 16-year-old student was instructed by the Head Teacher, Mr Sharkey, to remove an LGBT Pride badge from his uniform on the basis that it "Promoted homosexuality". However, West Lothian Council later denied these claims stating "Pupils at St Kentigern’s are asked to remove all non-school related badges from their uniforms".

In 2017 and 2019, Computing Science teacher, Toni Scullion, won a number of awards for her work in furthering women in Tech, including the 2019 Secondary Teacher of the Year award at the Scottish Women in Tech awards.

The school also suffered a stabbing in 2017, where a 13-year-old slashed a 14-year-old in the canteen, which had around 200 people in it at the time. The weapon was believed to be a kitchen knife. Charges were pressed on the 13 year-old perpetrator and a report would be sent to the procurator fiscal

References

Catholic secondary schools in West Lothian